Mark Lewin (born March 16, 1937) is an American retired professional wrestler.

Early life 
Lewin was born in Buffalo, New York. He had two elder brothers, Donn and Ted, both of whom also became professional wrestlers. He attended Lafayette High School.

Professional wrestling career 
Lewin was trained to wrestle by his brother-in-law, Danny McShain. He debuted in 1953 at the age of 16.

Lewin had great early success in a matinee-idol babyface tag team with Don Curtis, headlining in major territories like New York and Chicago. The team's brief heel turn was a shock to its many fans. The team split up in the early '60s and Mark embarked on a singles career.

In 1963, Mark first tried out the "Maniac"/"Mad" Mark Lewin persona, which he would alternate consistently with his 'normal' babyface persona for the rest of his career. He wrestled in Australia and New Zealand in the 1960s and 1970s with great success, especially in New Zealand where he drew huge crowds during the tours. He frequently formed a tag team in Australia and New Zealand with King Curtis Iaukea. He also spent time in Detroit working against The Sheik and fellow wildman, Terry Funk. Lewin also wrestled in Vancouver with NWA All Star Wrestling, where he feuded with the likes of Gene Kiniski and "Bulldog" Bob Brown and twice won the Pacific Coast Heavyweight title.

He found a lot of success in World Class Championship Wrestling in the late 1970s and early 1980s before going to Florida Championship Wrestling, where he joined Kevin Sullivan's "cult" as The Purple Haze, another variation of the 'Maniac' gimmick. Lewin competed at wrestling's first Pay-Per-View event Starrcade 1983; he and Kevin Sullivan won their match.

Lewin worked as a booker for Jim Barnett in Australia.

He was one of Sabu's frequent opponents in the 1980s.

Lewin retired in 1988, but came back mid 2003 to work for Eddie Jr. and Thomas Farhat to start up All World Wrestling League/Big Time Wrestling.

Championships and accomplishments
All-Star Pro Wrestling
NWA Australasian Tag Team Championship (3 times) - with Steve Rickard (1), Al Perez (1), and Spiros Arion (1)
Big Time Wrestling
NWA United States Heavyweight Championship (Detroit version)]] (2 times)
Capitol Wrestling Corporation
[[WWWF United States Tag Team Championship|NWA United States Tag Team Championship (Northeast version) (2 times) - with Don Curtis
Championship Wrestling from Florida
NWA Southern Heavyweight Championship (Florida version) (1 time)
Georgia Championship Wrestling
NWA International Tag Team Championship (Georgia version) (1 time) - with Donn Lewin
Maple Leaf Wrestling
NWA International Tag Team Championship (Toronto version) (1 time) - with Whipper Billy Watson
NWA All-Star Wrestling
NWA Canadian Tag Team Championship (Vancouver version) (1 time) - with Steven Little Bear
NWA Pacific Coast Heavyweight Championship (Vancouver version) (2 times)
NWA Hollywood Wrestling
WWA Americas Heavyweight Championship (1 time)
WWA World Heavyweight Championship (1 time)
NWA Big Time Wrestling / World Class Championship Wrestling
NWA American Tag Team Championship (2 times) - with The Spoiler
NWA Brass Knuckles Championship (Texas version) (8 times)
NWA Texas Heavyweight Championship (3 times)
NWA Texas Tag Team Championship (1 time) - with Dick Steinborn
NWA World Six-Man Tag Team Championship (Texas version) (1 time) - with Killer Tim Brooks & One Man Gang
Pro Wrestling Illustrated
PWI ranked him # 265 of the 500 best singles wrestlers during the "PWI Years" in 2003.
Professional Wrestling Hall of Fame and Museum
(Class of 2009) - with Don Curtis
World Championship Wrestling (Australia)
IWA World Heavyweight Championship (2 times)
IWA World Tag Team Championship (8 times) - with King Curtis Iaukea (2), Bearcat Wright (1), Dominic DeNucci (1), Spiros Arion (1), Mario Milano, (1), Killer Kowalski (1) and Antonio Pugliese (1)
NWA Austra-Asian Tag Team Championship (1 time) - with Spiros Arion
Wrestling Observer Newsletter
Wrestling Observer Newsletter Hall of Fame (Class of 2017)
1This World Championship Wrestling was an NWA affiliated promotion based in Australia that operated from the mid-1960s to the early-1990s. It is not the same promotion as the World Championship Wrestling that was once owned by Ted Turner and sold to World Wrestling Entertainment in 2001.

See also
 List of Jewish professional wrestlers

References

External links
 

1937 births
American male professional wrestlers
Jewish American sportspeople
Jewish professional wrestlers
Living people
Sportspeople from Buffalo, New York
Professional wrestlers from New York (state)
Professional Wrestling Hall of Fame and Museum
Professional wrestling promoters
Stampede Wrestling alumni
21st-century American Jews
20th-century professional wrestlers
NWA Southern Heavyweight Champions (Florida version)
NWA World Tag Team Champions (Florida version)
NWA International Tag Team Champions (Toronto version)
NWA Austra-Asian Tag Team Champions
IWA World Heavyweight Champions (Australia)
IWA World Tag Team Champions (Australia)